Manel Loureiro is a Spanish author.

Background
Manel Loureiro is a writer, journalist, and former lawyer born in Pontevedra, Spain, in 1975. He earned a law degree at the University of Santiago de Compostela, and has worked as a television presenter in the Television de Galicia1 and as a screenwriter. He collaborates with the daily newspapers of Pontevedra, newspaper ABC.2 and World.3, and is a regular contributor to the Cadena SER and to GQ magazine's Spanish edition. El Confidencial has called him the Spanish Stephen King.

Novels

Apocalypse Z series
His first novel, Apocalypse Z #1:  The Beginning of the End (in Spanish: Apocalipsis Z: El Principio Del Fin), began as a popular blog before its publication and eventually become a bestseller in several countries, including Brazil, Italy, and Spain. AmazonCrossing published book one in English, in October 2012, and the book was translated into Galician in 2013.  A film adaptation has also been proposed.

Loureiro has written two sequel novels in the Apocalypse Z series: Apocalypse Z #2: Dark Days (2010: in Spanish, Los días oscuros), and  Apocalypse Z #3: The Wrath of the Just (2011: in Spanish, La ira de los justos). Books two and three have been translated into English, Italian, and Portuguese, and book two was translated into Galician in 2014.

The Last Passenger
Loureiro's next book, The Last Passenger (2013: in Spanish, El último pasajero), is about a Nazi ghost ship. The novel was translated into English by Andres Alfaro.

Only She Sees
Loureiro's most recent book is Only She Sees (2015; in Spanish: Fulgor). The novel was translated into English by Andres Alfaro.

Personal life
Loureiro currently resides in Pontevedra, Spain, where he is a full-time writer.

References

Living people
1975 births
Spanish male writers
Zombie novels
21st-century Spanish lawyers